Marc Sand (born 23 January 1988 in Rosegg, Carinthia) is an Austrian footballer, who plays for SK Austria Klagenfurt.

Club career
Sand made his professional debut for Second Division FC Kärnten in the 2005/2006 season and moved to VfL Bochum in 2007. An injury cut short his season for Bochum's Oberliga team (VfL Bochum II) and he returned to Austria, signing for Austria Wien on loan for the 2008/2009 season.

External links
Player profile – Austria Wien
Profile – Austria Archive

1988 births
Living people
People from Villach-Land
Austrian footballers
FC Kärnten players
VfL Bochum II players
Dynamo Dresden players
Bayer 04 Leverkusen II players
Kapfenberger SV players
Austrian Football Bundesliga players
Expatriate footballers in Germany
3. Liga players
Association football forwards
Footballers from Carinthia (state)